Colin McIntosh (born 1 June 1949) is a New Zealand equestrian. He competed in the team jumping event at the 1988 Summer Olympics.

References

External links
 

1949 births
Living people
New Zealand male equestrians
Olympic equestrians of New Zealand
Equestrians at the 1988 Summer Olympics
People from Helensville